is a 1950 black and white Japanese film directed by Kyōtarō Namiki and produced by Shintoho.

Cast 
 Kanjūrō Arashi (嵐寛寿郎)
 Yatarō Kurokawa (黒川弥太郎)
 Akiko Sawamura (沢村晶子)
 Nijiko Kiyokawa (清川虹子)
 Kingorō Yanagiya (柳家金語楼)

See also 
 Kurama Tengu (film), a 1928 silent film

References

External links 
 http://www.allcinema.net/prog/show_c.php?num_c=160464

Japanese black-and-white films
1950 films
Films directed by Kyōtarō Namiki
1950s Japanese films